The Karnataka football team is an Indian football team representing Karnataka in Indian state football competitions including the Santosh Trophy.

They have appeared in the Santosh Trophy finals 9 times, and have won the trophy 4 times. Prior to 1972, the team competed as Mysore football team. During the 1969 Asian Champion Club Tournament (which is now known as AFC Champions League), they reached the semifinals (then known as Mysore State).

Squad

Current squad
The following 22 players were called up prior to the 2022–23 Santosh Trophy

Honours
 Santosh Trophy
 Winners (5): 1946–47, 1952–53, 1967–68, 1968–69, 2022–23
 Runners-up (5): 1953–54, 1955–56, 1962–63, 1970–71, 1975–76

National Games
 Bronze medal (1): 1997

 B.C. Roy Trophy
 Winners (4): 1962–63, 1978–79, 1991–92, 2002–03
 Runners-up (3): 1965–66, 1971–72, 2003–04

 Mir Iqbal Hussain Trophy
 Winners (2): 1978–79, 1986–87
 Runners-up (2): 1981, 2009–10

 M. Dutta Ray Trophy
 Runners-up (1): 1992

Performance in AFC competitions

 Asian Champion Club Tournament (now AFC Champions League)
 Fourth place: 1969 (as Mysore State)

References

Football in Karnataka
Santosh Trophy teams